Knowhere (pronounced "no where") is a fictional location appearing in American comic books published by Marvel Comics, and related media. It is depicted as the enormous severed head of an ancient celestial being, which serves as an interdimensional crossroads and scientific observatory.

Knowhere appears in the live-action Marvel Cinematic Universe films Thor: The Dark World (2013), Guardians of the Galaxy (film) (2014), Avengers: Infinity War (2018), the Disney+ animated series What If...?, the Disney+ animated series Guardians of the Galaxy, the live action The Guardians of the Galaxy Holiday Special (2022), and will return in Guardians of the Galaxy Vol. 3 (2023).

Development
When asked about how they came up with the idea, authors Dan Abnett and Andy Lanning said:

Overview
Located within what appears to be a severed head of a Celestial floating along The Rip (the extreme outer edge of all spacetime with no specific physical location), Knowhere acts as a makeshift port of call and observatory of the End of the Universe for intergalactic travelers of all species and from all times. First appearing in Nova (vol. 4) #8 (see Annihilation: Conquest), the station is administered by its chief of security, Cosmo, a telepathic and telekinetic Soviet space dog originally lost in Earth orbit in the 1960s.

Knowhere maintains minor facilities for close observation of the end of the Universe, a main hall, a marketplace and other amenities including the bar, Starlin's. Cosmo assigns special "passport" bracelets allowing instantaneous transportation to and from anywhere in the Universe via the deceased Celestial's "Continuum Cortex", located within the brain-stem, from where sensors can also detect subtle disruptions in space-time occurring outside The Rip in the greater Universe. Facilitated by Cosmo and Richard Rider, Knowhere comes to be used as the base of operations for the new Guardians of the Galaxy.

The origins of Knowhere as well as who could conceivably decapitate the God-like alien and how it would appeared at the end of the Universe were uncertain for a time. Abnett and Lanning have said that the origin is "A mystery that will have to wait for now, but it's a biggie!"

While recounting his origin to Eddie Brock, the Symbiote God Knull revealed that he was the one who killed the Celestial whose head became Knowhere with the use of All-Black The Necrosword and used his head to create more symbiotes.

Other versions 
During the Secret Wars storyline, Knowhere is shown to be the Moon that orbits Battleworld. According to  God Emperor Doom this Knowhere is the head of the  Celestial that came to collect Battleworld but was slain in battle by the God Emperor himself and its head is still in orbit around Battleworld as a reminder of Doom's power.

In other media

Television
 Knowhere appears in the Guardians of the Galaxy animated series. Like the comics, Cosmo the Spacedog serves as the chief of security. It first appears in the episode "Road to Knowhere", in which the Guardians of the Galaxy travel to a Knowhere market in order to sell an item stolen from Korath the Pursuer. Amidst a fight between the Guardians, Korath's group, and the Ravagers, Knowhere starts to come to life and ensnares everyone.
 Knowhere appears in the Disney+ animated series What If...? (2021) episode "What If... T'Challa Became a Star-Lord?"

Marvel Cinematic Universe

Knowhere appears in media set in the Marvel Cinematic Universe. This version serves as the Collector's headquarters, in which his Tivan Corporation mine cellular material to sell on the black market, and then becoming the headquarters for the Guardians of the Galaxy.
 In Thor: The Dark World, Sif and Volstagg give the Collector the Reality Stone for safekeeping.
 In Guardians of the Galaxy, Gamora, Peter Quill, Drax, Rocket, and Groot visit Knowhere to sell an orb to the Collector and learn that it contains the Power Stone. 
 In Avengers: Infinity War, Gamora, Quill, Drax, and Mantis travel to Knowhere to confront Thanos before he can take the Reality Stone, but fail to stop him.
 In The Guardians of the Galaxy Holiday Special, it is revealed that the Guardians have purchased Knowhere and are working on renovations following the attack on it. They hold a Christmas celebration there for Quill.

Video games
 Knowhere appears as the main setting of the  Guardians of the Galaxy play set for Disney Infinity: Marvel Super Heroes.
 Knowhere, merged with the Strider series' Third Moon to become Knowmoon, appears as a stage in Marvel vs. Capcom: Infinite.
 Knowhere appears in Lego Marvel Super Heroes 2.
 Knowhere appears in Guardians of the Galaxy: The Telltale Series.
 Knowhere appears in Marvel's Guardians of the Galaxy.

Reception
Russ Burlingame considered the rendering of Knowhere "one of the most striking and potentially bizarre images" from the Guardians of the Galaxy movie trailer.

Silverman and Brode described Knowhere as a "criminal lair" at "the fringes of space". They considered the setting a modern incarnation of the frontier of classic Western films, "a place where outlaws and renegades skirt the trappings of society far from the dictates of civilization".

References

Bibliography
 Nova (vol. 4) #8 and #9 (published November and December 2007)
 Guardians of the Galaxy (vol. 2) #1 (published May 2008)
 Guardians of the Galaxy (vol. 2) #8 (published December 2008)
 Deadpool (vol. 6) #30 (published May 2017)

External links
 Knowhere at Marvel.com
 

2008 comics debuts
Guardians of the Galaxy
End of the universe in fiction
Marvel Comics locations
Fictional space stations
Fictional elements introduced in 2008